
Gmina Subkowy is a rural gmina (administrative district) in Tczew County, Pomeranian Voivodeship, in northern Poland.

In 2022 its population was 5,371.

Villages
Gmina Subkowy contains the villages and settlements of Brzuśce, Bukowiec, Gorzędziej, Mała Słońca, Mały Garc, Mały Gorzędziej, Narkowy, Pasiska, Radostkowo, Radostowo, Rybaki, Starzęcin, Subkowskie Pole, Subkowy, Subkowy Małe, Waćmierz, Wielgłowy and Wielka Słońca.

Neighbouring gminas
Gmina Subkowy is bordered by the gminas of Miłoradz, Pelplin, Starogard Gdański and Tczew.

References
Polish official population figures 2006

Subkowy
Tczew County